Narrows Dam and Power Plant Complex is a national historic district located at Badin, Stanly County, North Carolina. The district encompasses one contributing building and two contributing structures in the company town of Badin.  The dam and power plant were built in 1917 by Alcoa to support the Badin plant.  At the time of its completion, the Narrows Dam was the world's highest overflow type dam.  The Narrows power plant is a one-story building nine bays wide with a gable roof and six-foot raised monitor roof.

It was added to the National Register of Historic Places in 1983.

References

Industrial buildings and structures on the National Register of Historic Places in North Carolina
Dams on the National Register of Historic Places in North Carolina
Historic districts on the National Register of Historic Places in North Carolina
Buildings and structures in Stanly County, North Carolina
National Register of Historic Places in Stanly County, North Carolina